Onopordum nervosum, called Moor's cotton thistle or reticulate thistle, is a species of flowering plant in the genus Onopordum native to the Iberian peninsula. It has gained the Royal Horticultural Society's Award of Garden Merit.

Subspecies
The following subspecies are currently accepted:

Onopordum nervosum subsp. castellanum Gonz.Sierra, Pérez Morales, Penas & Rivas Mart.
Onopordum nervosum subsp. nervosum

References

nervosum
Plants described in 1841